Gambling Wives is a  1924 American silent melodrama film. Directed by Dell Henderson and produced by actor-producer Ben F. Wilson, it was released through Arrow Films. The film stars Marjorie Daw.

Plot
As described in a film magazine review, Vincent Forrest is a young bank clerk who, lured by a desire for gambling, visits a fashionable gambling house run by Madame Zoe, who is being maintained by Van Merton. Sylvia Baldwin, a friend of his wife Ann tells her what is happening, and advises her to play his game in order to win him back. Since the husband is infatuated with Madame Zoe, Sylvia arranges so that Ann is able to interest herself in Merton. The usual complications arise, and the husband realizes what is happening in time to save his wife and restore happiness to their marriage.

Cast

Preservation
With no copies of Gambling Wives located in any film archives, it is a lost film.

References

External links

1924 films
1924 drama films
Silent American drama films
Lost American films
American silent feature films
American black-and-white films
American independent films
Melodrama films
1924 lost films
Lost drama films
Arrow Film Corporation films
Films directed by Dell Henderson
1920s American films